The following is a list of the municipalities (comuni) of Marche, Italy.

There are 228 municipalities in Marche (as of January 2019):

47 in the Province of Ancona
33 in the Province of Ascoli Piceno
40 in the Province of Fermo
55 in the Province of Macerata
53 in the Province of Pesaro e Urbino

List

See also
List of municipalities of Italy

References

 
Geography of the Marche
Marche